St Bartholomew's Church is the redundant Church of England parish church of Basildon in the English county of Berkshire. It lies in the hamlet of Lower Basildon and is now owned by the Churches Conservation Trust. The church is designated by Historic England as a Grade I listed building.

Building
The church was built in the late 13th century out of flint with stone dressings, with an old tiled roof. The west tower of 1734 is of grey brick with red dressings and has three stages. Below the louvred bell stage, containing four bells, is a clock on the south side. The church plan consists of nave, chancel, south porch and north aisle. The gabled porch is 19th-century, as are the lean-to north aisle and chancel roof of 1876.

In the chancel wall is a 14th-century chest tomb, reused as a monument to Sir Francis Sykes, who died in 1804 and to his son. There is a 15th-century font.

Churchyard
The churchyard is notable as the resting place of Jethro Tull, the 18th-century modernising farmer, whose modern gravestone can be seen there. He died in 1741 but according to his gravestone, he was buried on 9 March 1740. This apparent confusion is due to the burial date being in the Old Style.

See also
List of churches preserved by the Churches Conservation Trust in South East England

References

External links
Royal Berkshire History: Basildon Church
St Bartholomew, The Churches Conservation Trust

Church of England church buildings in Berkshire
Grade I listed churches in Berkshire
Churches preserved by the Churches Conservation Trust
Former churches in Berkshire